Laxminarayan College, Jharsuguda, also called L. N. College, is a full-fledged aided College of the Government of Odisha located in Jharsuguda district of Odisha. It was founded on 18 August 1969. This college comes under Sambalpur University. It imparts teaching in Arts, Science and Commerce both in +2 or senior secondary education and +3(three year) Degree Course stage with honours teaching facilities.

History
The college is one of the oldest college in western Odisha being established on 18 August 1969. Laxminarayan College is a fully aided educational institution of the government of Odisha, having many UGC- scale teachers. The college was credited with a "B" grade by NAAC in 2011/12.

College
Being a Degree College it is also being recognized as a junior college and also offers vocational courses. The Degree college comes under College code-14082303 and The Junior and vocational under the college code-14082101 and 14081802 respectively.

Affiliation
This college is afflicted to Sambalpur university. This college is recognised as Laxmi Narayan (Degree) College, Jharsuguda.

Junior College and Vocational
Along with L. N. College other Government college recognized by Odisha Government  in  Jharsuguda (MPL) Block area of Jharsuguda.

Other junior colleges
Other junior Colleges which are present in the Jharsuguda(MPL) Block area include :-
Women's Higher Secondary School, Jharsuguda
Aryabhatt Higher Secondary School, Bijunagar, Bombay Chowk, Jharsuguda
Hemalata Science Higher Secondary School, Sarbahal, Jharsuguda
Black Diamond Higher Secondary School, Jharsuguda
Pradosh Kumar Smruti Smaraki Higher Secondary School, H. Katapali	
Salegram Sakunia Higher Secondary School, Talpatia

List of governing Bodies
These are the list of governing Bodies of L. N. College Jharsuguda.

List of Principals
These are the list of principles of L. N college Jharsuguda.

Building
Although the main building of the college is housed in an erstwhile Hostel of the Engineering School of Jharsuguda, later on many new infrastructures along with a sports complex financed by the UGC has been added. The building will be shifted to a new place after the approval of Government of Odisha.

Naac Grade 2018
According to latest reports of N.A.A.C 34th Meeting of the Standing Committee (30 November 2018), list of Institutions Recommended for Accreditation by NAAC 2nd cycle report, L. N. College had ranked Grade C with CGPA 1.94. The grade system of N.A.A.C usually lasts for 5 years and after the completion of 5 years the NAAC team again visits the respective college for grading.

N.A.A.C grades institute with 8 grade ladder :-

See also

References

External links
L. N. College Website
Sambalpur University Website

Department of Higher Education, Odisha
Universities and colleges in Odisha
1969 establishments in Orissa
Jharsuguda district
Colleges affiliated to Sambalpur University
Educational institutions established in 1969